Crook County is one of the 36 counties in the U.S. state of Oregon. As of the 2020 census, the population was 24,738. The county seat is Prineville. The county is named after George Crook, a U.S. Army officer who served in the American Civil War and various Indian Wars.

Crook County comprises the Prineville, OR Micropolitan Statistical Area, which is included in the Bend--Prineville, OR Combined Statistical Area.

History

Crook County was established on October 9, 1882, by an act of the Oregon State Legislature. The county was named after General George Crook, a veteran of various battles against the indigenous peoples of Eastern Oregon in the middle of the 19th century. The county was formed from territory formerly part of Wasco County, including the hilly region where the foothills of the Blue Mountains intersect the Cascade Mountain Range.

Access into the region at first was difficult, which discouraged settlement. The first effort to develop routes into the area was in 1862 when a supply train with cattle crossed the Scott Trail. This was also the first group of non-natives to spend the winter in central Oregon. The discovery and development of the Santiam Pass in the 1860s improved access into the area.

Prineville, incorporated in 1880 and then the only incorporated town in the county, was established as the county seat. This decision was confirmed by the voters in the 1884 general election.

From the start cattle ranching has been one of the primary industries of the county, with huge herds grazing the countryside from the 1880s. Farming was also developed in certain valley regions friendly to agriculture.

Logging in the Ochoco Mountains and the timber mills that accompanied also greatly contributed to the economic and population growth of the county. The first recorded mention of a sawmill was made by George Barnes, speaking about the Swartz sawmill on Mill Creek, circa 1867.

Geography

The county is located in the geographic center of Oregon. The largest body of water in Crook County is the Prineville Reservoir. The present boundaries were established in 1927.

The oldest geological formation in Oregon is in the southeastern corner of Crook County, near its boundary with Grant County. This formation is an outcropping of Devonian limestone created from a larger reef when most of Oregon was covered by water.

Adjacent counties
 Jefferson County - north
 Wheeler County - north
 Grant County - east
 Harney County - southeast
 Deschutes County - southwest

National protected area
Ochoco National Forest (part)

Demographics

2000 census
As of the census of 2000, there were 19,182 people, 7,354 households, and 5,427 families living in the county. The population density was 6 people per square mile (2/km2). There were 8,264 housing units at an average density of 3 per square mile (1/km2). The racial makeup of the county was 92.95% White, 0.04% Black or African American, 1.30% Native American, 0.43% Asian, 0.03% Pacific Islander, 3.81% from other races, and 1.43% from two or more races. 5.64% of the population were Hispanic or Latino of any race. 26.2% were of American, 14.8% German, 9.7% English and 8.9% Irish ancestry.

There were 7,354 households, out of which 32.30% had children under the age of 18 living with them, 61.50% were married couples living together, 8.20% had a female householder with no husband present, and 26.20% were non-families. 21.30% of all households were made up of individuals, and 9.50% had someone living alone who was 65 years of age or older. The average household size was 2.57 and the average family size was 2.96.

In the county, the population was spread out, with 26.60% under the age of 18, 7.50% from 18 to 24, 25.50% from 25 to 44, 25.70% from 45 to 64, and 14.70% who were 65 years of age or older. The median age was 39 years. For every 100 females there were 99.40 males.  For every 100 females age 18 and over, there were 97.30 males.

The median income for a household in the county was $35,186, and the median income for a family was $40,746. Males had a median income of $32,166 versus $22,580 for females. The per capita income for the county was $16,899. About 8.10% of families and 11.30% of the population were below the poverty line, including 13.90% of those under age 18 and 8.10% of those age 65 or over.

2010 census
As of the 2010 census, there were 20,978 people, 8,558 households, and 6,025 families living in the county. The racial makeup of the county was 92.7% white, 1.4% American Indian, 0.5% Asian, 0.2% black or African American, 0.1% Pacific islander, 3.2% from other races, and 2.0% from two or more races. Those of Hispanic or Latino origin made up 7.0% of the population. In terms of ancestry, 20.7% were German, 14.6% were English, 12.6% were Irish, and 6.2% were American.

Of the 8,558 households, 27.7% had children under the age of 18 living with them, 57.1% were married couples living together, 9.0% had a female householder with no husband present, 29.6% were non-families, and 24.1% of all households were made up of individuals. The average household size was 2.42 and the average family size was 2.84. The median age was 45.6 years.

The median income for a household in the county was $46,059 and the median income for a family was $52,477. Males had a median income of $41,375 versus $29,545 for females. The per capita income for the county was $22,275. About 10.6% of families and 14.0% of the population were below the poverty line, including 26.1% of those under age 18 and 4.0% of those age 65 or over.

Communities

City
Prineville (county seat)

Census-designated places
Juniper Canyon
Ochoco West
Prineville Lake Acres

Other unincorporated communities

Forest Crossing
Lone Pine
O'Neil
Paulina
Post
Powell Butte
Roberts
Suplee

Politics
Though Crook County is the most central county in Oregon, politically it falls in line with the eastern side of the state. The majority of registered voters who are part of a political party in Crook County, as well as most counties in eastern Oregon, are members of the Republican Party. Crook County was formerly a presidential bellwether county, voting with the winner since 1884, in 27 Presidential elections. However, the county lost its bellwether status after voting for George H. W. Bush in 1992. It has voted Republican ever since.

Economy
Forest products, agriculture, livestock raising and recreation/tourism services constitute Crook County's total economy. Agriculture is supported by the development of irrigation districts, which permits the raising of hay, grain, mint, potatoes, and seed. Range and forest lands allow grazing for a sizable livestock industry. The Ochoco National Forest's stand of ponderosa pine is the main source of lumber. Tourism and recreation help round out the economy. Thousands of hunters, fishers, boaters, sightseers and rockhounds are annual visitors to its streams, reservoirs and the Ochoco Mountains.

See also
National Register of Historic Places listings in Crook County, Oregon
Cook County, Illinois

References

Further reading
 

 
1882 establishments in Oregon
Populated places established in 1882